Hummingbirds of the Americas is the 2001 solo album by Jimmy Ibbotson. Ibbotson is a former member of the Nitty Gritty Dirt Band.

Track listing
"Hummingbird" (Jimmy Ibbotson) -
"Darlin' Be Home Soon" (John Sebastian) -
"Wildcard and Brenda" (Jimmy Ibbotson) -
"Tulane and Johnny" (Chuck Berry) -
"Darlin' Companion" (John Sebastian) -
"The Man from Huachanango" (Jimmy Ibbotson) -
"People by the Sea" (Jimmy Ibbotson) -
"Nina Preciosa" (Jimmy Ibbotson) -
"In the Garden" (C. Austin Miles) -
"Ernie was the Preacher's Dog" (Jimmy Ibbotson) -
"Telluride" (Jimmy Ibbotson) -

Personnel
Jimmie Ibbotson
John McEuen and the Flying Dog Bluegrass Boys on "In The Garden"
John McEuen on "Telluride"

Production
Producer - Jimmy Ibbotson

References

2001 albums
Jimmy Ibbotson albums